Two ships of the Royal Navy have borne the name Egret, after the bird, the Egret:

 was a trawler hired between 1918 and 1919.
 was an  sloop launched in 1938 and sunk in 1943.

Royal Navy ship names